Rise to Power may refer to:
 Rise to Power (Kane & Abel album), 1999
 Rise to Power (Monstrosity album), 2003
 Rise to Power (Rick Ross album), 2007
 Rise to Power (Battlecross album), 2015
 Star Wars: Rise to Power, an unreleased mobile game